Salmoni (Σαλμώνη) may refer to:

Salmoni, Elis, a village in the municipality of Pyrgos, Elis regional unit

People
Salmoni (cricketer) (fl. 1830s), English cricketer
Dave Salmoni (born 1975), Canadian animal trainer, entertainer and television producer
Rubino Romeo Salmonì (1920-2011), Italian writer

See also
Anticoreura salmoni, an insect native to Colombia
Beddomeia salmonis, a species of very small freshwater snail
Brachygalba salmoni, a bird species known as the dusky-backed jacamar
Chrysothlypis salmoni, a bird species known as the scarlet-and-white tanager
Lepeophtheirus salmonis, a copepod known as the salmon louse
Phaio salmoni, a moth of the family Arctiidae